Sedenia cervalis is a moth in the family Crambidae. It is found in Australia, where it has been recorded from South Australia and New South Wales.

References

Moths described in 1854
Spilomelinae
Taxa named by Achille Guenée